= Rilo (singer) =

Background information
- Born: Ricardo López; 1991; Bogotá, Colombia
- Occupation: Singer-songwriter
- Years active: 2016–present
- Website: soyrilo.com

Rilo (born Ricardo López in 1991) is a Colombian singer-songwriter. Born in Bogotá, Colombia, he is based in New York. He is known for his single "Buscando tu amor" (2016).

== Career ==
Rilo began his recording career in 2016 with the release of his debut single, "Buscando tu amor". Written by López and produced by Colombian music producer Pablo Uribe, the song combines reggae and pop influences. It reached number one on Monitor Latino's Top 20 General chart in Venezuela in December 2016 and topped the Record Report chart in March 2017. It also ranked second on Record Report's year-end Top Latin 40 chart for 2016.

In 2022, López released "Ella bailó", his second single under the stage name Rilo. The accompanying music video was filmed in Cartagena, Colombia, and directed by Gustavo Gacha.

In November 2026, he released "Pronto vuelvo", a song about living away from one's homeland and family. Its accompanying music video documents a surprise visit to his mother in Bogotá.

== Discography ==
=== Singles ===
- "Buscando tu amor" (2016)
- "Ella bailó" (2022)
- "Pronto vuelvo" (2026)

== Chart performance ==
Year	Song	Chart	Peak
2016	"Buscando tu amor"	Venezuela (Monitor Latino Top 20 General)	1
2017	"Buscando tu amor"	Venezuela (Record Report)	1

Year-end chart (2016)	Position
Venezuela Top Latin 40 (Record Report)	2
